Lloyd Miller (born 1938) is an American jazz musician and world music expert, who is well known for his research work on Persian music and Afghan music. He can play 100 instruments in 15 jazz, ethnic and world music traditions.

Lloyd Miller received a doctorate in Middle East Studies: Persian, concentrating on Persian music with a minor in music (jazz.) In 1970, Miller was awarded a Fulbright scholarship to return to Iran to research and complete his dissertation soon after was published by Rutledge Curzon under the title "Music and Song in Persia." While writing his dissertation, Miller spent seven years in Tehran as an arts writer for several publications and as a PR person for the Center for Preservation and Propagation of Iranian Music. In 2012, his original first PhD dissertation was published by Eastern Arts at BYU under the title "Afghan Music and Dance".

His native language is English, and he is fluent in Persian, Dari and French, capable in Swedish, German and a few other languages. In the early 1960s, Lloyd attended the Sorbonne and the Langues Orientale in Paris and went to school in Geneva for a time. During the 1950s and 1960s, Miller played with top jazz artists in Europe including Don Ellis and Eddie Harris. Miller was interested in eastern culture and music. He also was the soloist in the music ensemble of Jef Gilson in Paris.

In 1963, Miller returned to the U.S. to study at BYU in Utah. There he organized Eastern and jazz music ensembles and won the composer's trophy at the 1967 Intercollegiate Jazz Festival before earning his BA in Asian Studies then going on to University of Utah to work on a MA in Middle East Studies. In 1967, under sponsorship of the Middle East Center and the Music Department, Miller initiated and taught classes in music of Persia, Afghanistan and the Far East until the early 1980s, adding jazz classes in the late 1970s. In 1968 and 1969, Miller again won trophies at the Intercollegiate Jazz Festival and attended the intercollegiate nationals in St. Louis. In 1969, he won the national Sounds of Young America composers contest for his Indonesian jazz piece "Yona".

In 1969, Miller went to Iran again on a Fulbright scholarship and remained there for seven years, mastering Persian music as well as other Middle Eastern traditional and folk music genres, mainly under the supervision of masters Dr. Daryush Safvat and Mahmud Karimi as well as other masters. As experts in their field, they recommended Miller's research work to his U of U dissertation committee, who approved his music dissertation based on authorization by Safvat and Karimi. In 1996, Miller initiated and taught classes in Persian, Afghan and Far Eastern music at BYU.

Dr. Miller is also known as Kurosh Ali Khan, a name he used while hosting a prime-time television show in Tehran, Iran in the 1970s.  The program was known as Kurosh Ali Khan va Dustan, or Kurosh Ali Khan and Friends, a variety show with music. He was an arts critic and journalist for several years in Iran frequently submitting articles under various names to Tehran Journal, Kayhan International, Ayendegan, Iran Air Homa, Around Iran, Etela'at and Sketch Magazine in Beirut.  He attended the Shiraz Arts Festival and Tehran Film Festival several times as an official journalist where he met and worked with many well-known artists from various countries.

His mother, Mrs. Maxine Adams Miller, was the author of Bright Blue Beads: An American Family In Persia, and Dr. Miller is the author of Music and Song in Persia: The Art of Avaz published by Curzon Press London and also by University of Utah Press.  Maxine's father was attorney W. Lloyd Adams a prominent figure in Rexburg Idaho and beloved "father of Madison County."  Lloyd Miller is his only grandson and Adams was Lloyd's family mentor.

Lloyd's recording titled Oriental Jazz, produced in the 1960s, has become a much sought after collectors' item and was re-released recently as a CD and is a popular item in Europe and the UK and features many selections of jazz and oriental music blends. He also released seven other vinyl LPs during the 1960s and has released over 30 CDs and DVDs of his own music, and including music and dance featuring other known virtuoso artists.

References

1938 births
Living people
American male musicians
University of Tehran alumni
University of Utah alumni
Place of birth missing (living people)
American jazz musicians
American male jazz musicians
Fulbright alumni